The Lever Brothers Factory in the Sydney, Australia suburb of Balmain was a soap factory which operated from 1895 until 1988. It employed many people from the local area and its large industrial buildings were a prominent feature of the landscape. Most of the site was demolished in 1996 to make way for a new apartment complex and only three of the original buildings remain.

Localization
The factory was situated on a 10 hectare (24.71 acre) site near Booth Street and Punch Park in the western end of Balmain, adjacent to White Bay.

History

The British Lever Brothers company was founded in 1885 by William Hesketh Lever. Lever Brothers Ltd was incorporated in Australia on 21 June 1894. Soon after this, in 1897, Lever Brothers established a plant at Balmain to extract oil from copra which was shipped back to Liverpool, England. In 1900, the Balmain plant began to manufacture Sunlight soap and glycerine, and other products followed.

Early in 1914, William Lever visited Melbourne as part of a worldwide tour of Lever interests. During the visit he met with J.Kitchen & Sons, who were established soap manufacturers, and offered to amalgamate the two firms. After consideration, it was agreed that Lever Bros would purchase three-quarters of the shares in J.Kitchen & Sons in return for cumulative preferred ordinary shares in Levers. Levers later bought all the remaining shares, and by about 1923–24 fully owned both companies. Shortly after, the company became known as Lever & Kitchen.

In 1989, the Home and Personal Care businesses of Lever & Kitchen merged with Rexona in Australia to form L&K: Rexona. The company changed name in 1993 to Lever Rexona and in 2000 merged with Unilever Foods to form what is now Unilever Australasia.

At its prime in 1958, the Balmain factory employed as many as 1,250 workers, many of whom were local residents. The complex contained a glycerine refinery, toilet soap plant, an oil refining and hardening works, as well as many storage tanks, extensive wharves and a small fleet of lighters and workboats.

The Balmain plant was wound down from the 1970s, having lost its waterfront and glycerine plant to the container wharf development at White Bay. Production eventually ceased in 1988. Together with the adjoining Ampol site, the area was sold in 1996 for the development of the Watervale, Dockside and Somerset Mews apartment complexes. Like many of the other Balmain industries such as the former Balmain Power Station, the Colgate-Palmolive Factory, and the many shipyards, boilermakers and docks scattered about the Balmain foreshores, the Lever Brothers Factory lost out to the ever-increasing property values in the area.

Other information
 Balmain master soapmaker, William Wainwright, was mayor of Balmain in 1922 and one of a number of Freemasons at Lever Brothers.
 As well as soap and glycerine, the factory also produced Lifebuoy antiseptic soap, Monkey Brand, Lux flakes and toilet soap, Pears soap, Rinso, Persil, Solvol, Omo, Handy Andy and Continental packet soups.
 William Lever is credited as being the first soap manufacturer to imprint a brand name on a bar of soap ('Sunlight') and wrap it before sale.
 In 1930, Australian politician William Wentworth worked briefly at the site as a factory-hand.

References

External links

NSW Planning - Local Walks

Buildings and structures in Sydney
Buildings and structures demolished in 1996
Unilever
Balmain, New South Wales